Koin or KOIN may refer to:

 KOIN, a TV station in Portland, Oregon
 Koin, Guinea

See also 
 Koine (disambiguation)